Sicus is a genus of flies from the family Conopidae.

Species
S. abdominalis Kröber, 1915
S. alpinus Stuke, 2002
S. caucasicus  Zimina, 1963
S. chvalai Stuke, 2004
S. ferrugineus (Linnaeus, 1761)
S. fusenensis Ôuchi, 1939
S. nigritarsis Zimina, 1975
S. nishitapensis  (Matsumura, 1916)

References

Conopidae
Conopoidea genera
Taxa named by Giovanni Antonio Scopoli